Lothar Witzke (May 15, 1895 – January 6, 1962) was a junior officer in the German Imperial Navy, who, after escaping from internment in neutral Chile, became a spy and saboteur on active service in the United States and Mexico during the First World War.

Arrested in 1918, he was sentenced to death, but his life was saved by the Armistice of 11 November 1918. In 1923 he was pardoned and released. During the Second World War he served in the Abwehr and after the war became a German Party member of the Hamburg Parliament.

Naval career 

Born in Kreis Koschmin, in the Province of Posen, Witzke was educated at Posen Academy and then entered the German Naval Academy as a seventeen-year-old cadet. By the beginning of the First World War he was a lieutenant in the Imperial German Navy on the light cruiser SMS Dresden. After many months of excitement, during which the Dresden played havoc with Allied shipping and hid from British warships, she was eventually caught and sunk. Witzke's leg was broken in the action. Together with other survivors of the crew, he was interned in Valparaíso, Chile.

Sabotage activities 

In California he reported to Franz Bopp, the German Consul General, who put him in touch with another saboteur, Kurt Jahnke, based in Mexico City. At this time the American law enforcement knew nothing of Jahnke's and Witzke's surreptitious activities. Both showed special aptitude for secret service work and were of a caliber far superior to Bopp's other agents. So cleverly did they cover their tracks that they were never even suspected during the period of US neutrality.

In addition to their work on the West Coast, Witzke and Jahnke made frequent trips east on sabotage missions. After Bopp was arrested, they gradually shifted their operations to the industrial Eastern seaboard. Double agents of the U.S. Military Intelligence Corps connected Witzke to the munitions explosion of March 1917 at the Mare Island Naval Shipyard in Vallejo, California. Later, Witzke himself implied that he had taken part in the massive Black Tom explosion in New York harbor on July 30, 1916, which killed at least four and as many as seven people and was heard as far away as Philadelphia. Later investigations would rule out his connection to both.

Imprisonment 
Witzke was arrested at the Mexican border at 10 a.m. on February 1, 1918, near Nogales, Arizona. He claimed to be a Russian-American, "Pablo Waberski", returning to San Francisco. A 424-letter cryptogram was found sewn into the left upper sleeve of his jacket. Several months later this cryptogram was broken by John Matthews Manly, who worked with Herbert Yardley at the fledgling MI-8 and identified the bearer to the "Imperial Consular Authorities of the Republic of Mexico". Witzke was convicted by a court martial at Fort Sam Houston and sentenced to death. Twice he attempted to escape and once got out, but he was caught the same day emerging from a Mexican shack. On his return, a razor blade was found in his cell, and since suicide was feared, his top clothes were removed. On November 2, 1918, his sentence was approved by the Department Commander. However, with the Armistice of 11 November 1918 putting an effective end to the war, the death sentence was not carried out.

On May 27, 1920, President Woodrow Wilson commuted Witzke's death sentence to life imprisonment, and he was transferred to Leavenworth Prison. Meanwhile, the Weimar Republic was exerting great pressure for his release. On April 30, 1923, the German Ambassador asked for Witzke's release on the grounds that other countries, including Germany, had released all POWs, including spies. At the same time, a prison report showed that Witzke had heroically prevented a disaster by entering a prison boiler room after an explosion. On that basis, Witzke was pardoned by President Calvin Coolidge, released on September 26, 1923, and deported to Berlin.

On his arrival in the Weimar Republic, Lieutenant Witzke was decorated by the Reichswehr with the Iron Cross, First and Second Class.

He later joined the Abwehr and after the Second World War was living in Hamburg. He was a monarchist and a represented the German Party in the Hamburg Parliament from 1949 to 1952.

Other people
 Lothar Witzke (1903–1998) was a German composer (short bio in German).

See also
List of people pardoned or granted clemency by the president of the United States

References

Literature
 The Reader of Gentleman's Mail: Herbert O. Yardley and the Birth of American Codebreaking, David Kahn, Yale University Press, 2006

1895 births
1962 deaths
Military personnel from Poznań
People from the Province of Posen
World War I spies for Germany
German prisoners sentenced to death
German people imprisoned abroad
Prisoners sentenced to death by the United States military
Recipients of American presidential clemency
Saboteurs
German monarchists
Imperial German Navy personnel of World War I
Abwehr personnel of World War II
Politicians from Hamburg
German Party (1947) politicians
Members of the Hamburg Parliament
People convicted of spying